Schreckengost is a surname. Notable people with the surname include:

Don Schreckengost (1910–2001), American  ceramicist
Ossee Schreckengost (1875–1914), American baseball player
Viktor Schreckengost (1906–2008), American artist and industrial designer

Surnames of German origin